Substantive democracy is a form of democracy in which the outcome of elections is representative of the people. In other words, substantive democracy is a form of democracy that functions in the interest of the governed. Although a country may allow all citizens of age to vote, this characteristic does not necessarily qualify it as a substantive democracy.

In a substantive democracy, the general population plays a real role in carrying out its political affairs, i.e., the state is not merely set up as a democracy but it functions as one as well. This type of democracy can also be referred to as a functional democracy. There is no good example of an objectively substantive democracy.

The opposite of a substantive democracy is a procedural democracy, which is where the relevant forms of democracy exist but are not actually managed democratically.

See also
Procedural democracy

References

External links
Article from The Challenge of Democracy
Types of democracy